Globus Aerostaticus (Latin for hot air balloon) or Ballon Aerostatique (the French equivalent) was a constellation created by Jérôme Lalande in 1798. It lay between the constellations Piscis Austrinus, Capricornus and Microscopium. It is no longer in use.

The constellation was created to honor the invention of the Montgolfier brothers, who launched the first hot air balloon in the late eighteenth century.

References

External links
 Globus Aerostaticus: Ian Ridpath's Star Tales
 Globus Aerostaticus: Shane Horvatin, Abrams Planetarium

Former constellations